San Francisco de Asís may refer to:
 San Francisco de Asís, Atotonilco El Alto, Mexico
 San Francisco de Asís District, Peru
 San Francisco de Asís de Yarusyacán District, Peru
 San Francisco de Asís Parish (Apaxco), State of Mexico
 San Francisco de Asís Parish (Coacalco de Berriozábal), State of Mexico
 Iglesia de San Francisco de Asís (Santa Cruz de Tenerife), Spain
 Parroquia San Francisco de Asís, Montevideo, Uruguay
 Mission San Francisco de Asís, in California
 San Francisco de Asís (Almirante Brown), in Greater Buenos Aires

See also 
 Saint Francis of Assisi (disambiguation)